The Further Adventures of SuperTed is an animated television series produced by Hanna-Barbera and Siriol Animation in association with S4C, and continues the adventures of SuperTed. Only 13 episodes were produced and originally broadcast on The Funtastic World of Hanna-Barbera in the United States starting on 31 January 1989.

Production
The original SuperTed, created by Mike Young became the first British cartoon series to be aired on Disney Channel in the United States in 1984. Young moved to the United States to work on more animated series and in 1988 he made a SuperTed-sequel-type cartoon called Fantastic Max (originally based on the cartoon pilot Space Baby) produced by Hanna-Barbera, who decided to create a new series of SuperTed.

This new American version of the show takes on a more epic format, with Texas Pete, Bulk and Skeleton also joined by new villains. The theme song was replaced with a more American overture, and the show poked fun at all aspects of American culture, from the Grand Ole Opry to Star Wars. Only two of the original cast were used for this new series, with Victor Spinetti and Melvyn Hayes returning to voice Texas Pete and Skeleton. Unlike the original, the series used digital ink and paint.

In the UK, Mike Young and the BBC decided to rerecord the series to use the original voices of Derek Griffiths for SuperTed and Jon Pertwee for Spotty, which also resulted in some minor script changes. The episodes were also split into two parts, thus creating 26 10-minute stories, which resulted in the series not being broadcast until January 1990 on the BBC. It was repeated again twice in 1992 and 1993.

Characters

Heroes
 SuperTed (voiced by Derek Griffiths in the UK version, Danny Cooksey in the US version) - A teddy bear who was thrown aside of the rejects and brought to life by Spotty's cosmic dust, a be given special powers by Mother Nature. The main hero of the series who rescues all people who need help. 
 Spotty Man (voiced by Jon Pertwee in the UK version, Pat Fraley in the US version) - SuperTed's loyal friend who is a yellow alien in a yellow jump-suit with green spots all around him and came from the Planet Spot that bought SuperTed to life with his cosmic dust and flies with SuperTed on every mission, he likes a few things to be covered with spots, a number of things he hated were being tied up by SuperTed (aka Terrible Ted), his traveling bag being carried away by biting ants, being locked up at Fort Knox by Texas Pete, being knocked in the Texas snake pit by Texas Pete and a haybail, having a couple being ice-danced by Pengy and Dr Frost, looking good in stripes with a white tiger disguise over him and having his Spots taken away by Texas Pete. He is the second main hero of the series.

Friends
 Slim, Hoppy and Kitty (voiced by Danny Cooksey and Tress MacNeille) - The kids of Oklahoma whose animals won first pride in the rodeo prairie, but needed SuperTed's help when Texas Pete tried to ruin their bull riding competition by using a radio controlled bull and took them and the entire state of Texas, their only appearances were in "Texas Is Mine."
 Major Billy Bob (voiced by Danny Mann) - The owner of the Grand Ol Opry who makes SuperTed a singing star by signing a contract after saving country music (after watching him sing with Texas Pete with his pal Coral) at the end of "Phantom of the Grand Ol' Opry" (the only episode he features in).
 Billy (voiced by Robbie Lee) - The boy that needed SuperTed's help when his father Dr. Livings had been kidnapped by the Polka Dot tribe after a discovery in a cave of paintings at the primitive Brazilian Rainforest, his only appearance was in "Dot's Entertainment."
 The Space Beavers (voiced by Jerry Houser and Charlie Adler) - The Space Beavers get very naughty and they are invited to Dr. Frost and Pengy. They are greedy munching trees. Formally, they do not like SuperTed and Spotty. But they become good friends with them.
 Kiki (voiced by Georgi Irene) - The child with the pet whale (who she gave a good scrubbing) that got kidnapped by Texas Pete, Bulk and Skeleton to find sunken treasure and needed SuperTed's help to save it, after she has been rescued she rewards SuperTed and Spotty Man with a couple of Spotty shells. Her only appearance (with her pet whale for that matter) was in "The Mysticetae Mystery."
 Blotch (voiced by Billie Hayes) - Spotty's little sister.
 Prince Rajeash (voiced by Danny Cooksey) - An Indian prince who can't make decisions. He has an uncle, Prince Pyjamarama with his helper Mufti the fool. Prince Pyjamarama is not happy with Rajeash. Soon, Rajeash is betrayed by Prince Pyjamarama and nasty Mufti. But luckily, Rajeash's new friends SuperTed and Spotty help him and in the end, Rajeash now becomes a new raja after Prince Pyjamarama and Mufti flew to the water.

Villains
 Texas Pete (voiced by Victor Spinetti) - The principal antagonist of the series.
 Bulk (voiced by Frank Welker) - Texas Pete's fat, idiotic henchman.
 Skeleton (voiced by Melvyn Hayes) - Texas Pete's effeminate, nervous henchman.
 Polka Face (voiced by Howard Morris) - The Polka Dot Tribe leader who tries to sell his tribal lands. He reforms and vows to be a better man at the urging of Super Ted in the end of "Dot's Entertainment."
 Bubbles the Clown (voiced by Frank Welker) - A career burglar from Planet Boffo who escapes prison and enlists Skeleton and Bulk for a heist.
 Sleepless Knight (voiced by Kenneth Mars) - A knight who gives people nightmares.
 Dr. Frost (voiced by Kenneth Mars) - A mad scientist who plots to free the world while manipulating the Space Beavers into helping in his plot.
 Pengy (voiced by Charlie Adler) - Dr. Frost's penguin henchman.
 The Hairmongers- A group of aliens from the planet Fluffalot.
 Julius Scissors - Co-leader of the Hairmongers.
 Marcilia - Co-leader of the Hairmongers.
 The two spies from the enemy Striped Army
 Prince Pyjamarama (voiced by Frank Welker) - Prince Pyjamarama is Prince Rajeash's uncle and the main antagonist of the episode "Ruse of the Raja." He and his helper Mufti become traitors to Prince Rajeash.
 Mufti (voiced by Bob Arbogast) - Prince Pyjamarama's henchman.

Episode list

Home media

UK
Between 1990 and 1991 three videos were released by the BBC, whereas the two episodes of the British dub on each of the VHS tapes were made into 20-minute stories. No DVD releases have been made to date, in either the United Kingdom or the United States.

US
On 26 July 1990, Hanna-Barbera Home Video released The Further Adventures of SuperTed: 'Leave it to Space Beavers' on VHS (UPC: 017951751035), featuring the episodes Knox Knox! who's There?, Phantom of the Grand Ole Opry, Leave it to Space Beavers and Ruse of the Raja.

Cast

British main cast
 Derek Griffiths - SuperTed, Narrator
 Jon Pertwee - Spotty Man

British and American main cast
 Melvyn Hayes - Skeleton
 Victor Spinetti - Texas Pete
 Frank Welker - Bulk, Prince Pyjamarama (in "Ruse of the Raja"), Bubbles the Clown (in "Bubbles, Bubbles Everywhere"), Pengy (in "Space Beavers"), Pingu (in "Bubbles, Bubbles Everywhere")

American main cast
 Danny Cooksey - SuperTed, Slim and Hoppy (in "Texas is Mine"), Kids town boy (in "Ben-Fur"), Prince Rajeesh (in "Ruse of the Raja")
 Pat Fraley - Spotty Man
 Brian Mitchell - Narrator, Polka-Dot Elder (in "Dot's Entertainment")

Additional voices
 Charlie Adler - Wally the Beaver (in "Leave it to Space Beaver," uncredited), Pengy (in "Leave it to Space Beaver," uncredited)
 Bob Arbogast - Mufti (in "Ruse of the Raja")
 René Auberjonois -
 George Ball -
 Hamilton Camp - Sparky the Dog (in "Bubbles, Bubbles Everywhere")
 Philip Clarke -
 Barry Dennen -
 Dick Erdman -
 Billie Hayes - Blotch (in "Knox Knox, Who's There?"), Slot Machine Owner (in "Bubbles, Bubbles Everywhere")
 Whitby Hertford -
 Georgi Irene - Kiki (in "The Mysticetae Mystery")
 Arte Johnson -
 Marvin Kaplan -
 Robbie Lee - Billy the Kid (in "Dot's Entertainment"), Plush the Kid (in "Ben-Fur")
 Tress MacNeille - Kitty the Cowpolk Kid and her mom (in "Texas Is Mine"), Texas Pete's Mom (in "Bubbles, Bubbles Everywhere")
 Danny Mann - Major Billy Bob (in "Phantom of the Grand Ol' Opry").
 Kenneth Mars - Dr. Frost (in "Leave it to Space Beaver"), Sleepless Knight (in "Sleepless Nights")
 Cindy McGee -
 Howard Morris - Polka Face (in "Dot's Entertainment")
 Pat Musick -
 Rob Paulsen - Dr. Livings (in "Dot's Entertainment")
 Ann Ryerson -
 B.J. Ward - Polka-Hontas (in "Dots Entertainment")
 James Widdoes -
 Patric Zimmerman -

Crew
 Gordon Hunt - USA Recording Director
 Andrea Romano - Animation Casting Director
 Mike Young - Creator, UK Recording Director
 Kris Zimmerman - Talent Coordinator

References

External links

 
 Toonhound - SuperTed

1989 British television series debuts
1989 British television series endings
1990s British animated television series
1990s British children's television series
S4C original programming
1980s American animated television series
1989 American television series debuts
1989 American television series endings
BBC children's television shows
Australian Broadcasting Corporation original programming
The Funtastic World of Hanna-Barbera
American children's animated action television series
American children's animated space adventure television series
American children's animated science fantasy television series
American children's animated superhero television series
American animated television spin-offs
British children's animated action television series
British children's animated space adventure television series
British children's animated science fantasy television series
British children's animated superhero television series
British television spin-offs
Television series by Hanna-Barbera
Animated television series about bears
English-language television shows